The 2007 4 Nations Cup was held in Leksand, Sweden from November 7 to November 11, 2007. All games were played at the Ejendals Arena.  The teams involved were Canada, the United States, Sweden, and Finland. 

Canada defeated the USA 2-0 in the gold medal game.

Gold - Canada
Silver - USA
Bronze - Finland
Fourth - Sweden

References

See also
 4 Nations Cup

2007–08
2007–08 in Finnish ice hockey
2007–08 in Swedish ice hockey
2007–08 in Canadian women's ice hockey
2007–08 in American women's ice hockey
2007–08
2007–08 in women's ice hockey